Selena Remembered is a DVD/CD by Mexican-American Tejano singer Selena Quintanilla-Pérez, released on April 1, 1997 on VHS and on January 25, 2005 on DVD. The DVD features Edward James Olmos narrating special moments and triumphs that helped Selena, and her band Selena y Los Dinos, into superstardom in North America. The DVD's logo Her Life, Her Music, and Her Dream are featured on both the DVD and CD covers.

DVD track listing

CD track listing

References

Selena video albums
1997 video albums
Music video compilation albums
Compilation albums published posthumously
1997 compilation albums
Documentary films about women in music
Selena compilation albums
EMI Records compilation albums
EMI Records video albums
EMI Latin live albums
EMI Latin video albums
Live albums published posthumously
Video albums published posthumously